Business Leaders for Michigan is a private, non-profit organization based in Detroit, Michigan, United States. Originally formed in 1970 as the Detroit Renaissance, the organization was reconstituted in 2009 as Business Leaders for Michigan with an expanded focus on the entire state of Michigan. Membership consists exclusively of the most senior level executives, and chairpersons of many of the state's largest employers and universities.

Mission 

Business Leaders for Michigan, the state's business roundtable, is dedicated to making Michigan a Top 10 state for jobs, education, widely shared prosperity and a healthy economy. The organization is composed exclusively of the executive leaders of Michigan's largest companies and universities. Members drive nearly 40% of the state's economy, generate over $1 trillion in annual revenue and serve nearly half of all Michigan public university students.

Initiatives 

 Compete to Win: Michigan's Path to Top 10 A plan to make Michigan more competitive, with strategies to win new business, attract talent and generate more widely shared prosperity
 Michigan Turnaround Plan, a three-step plan for improving the state's economic and educational metrics
 Accelerate Michigan, a partnership between Business Leaders for Michigan and the University Research Corridor to facilitate a strategic alliance between the key business leaders and the leading research universities in Michigan, with the goal of accelerating the economic transformation of the area and cultivating entrepreneurship
 Detroit Creative Corridor Center is a partnership between Business Leaders for Michigan and the College for Creative Studies. DC3 was formed to accelerate the creative economy in Detroit with a focus on community outreach and events, business accelerator services, and resources for developing the talent of the creative professional. 
 Renaissance Venture Capital Fund, a $100 million "fund of funds" created with the goal of promoting the growth of venture capital investments in Michigan, primarily in relation to bridging the work done by the emerging innovative companies in the area with the more established industrial and commercial bases
 Annual Leadership Summit and CEO Summit, which are hosted to bring together Michigan business leaders and policymakers

Notable members 

 William Clay Ford, Jr., Executive Chairman of Ford Motor Company
 Dan Gilbert, founder and Chairman of Quicken Loans
 Roger Penske, Chairman of Penske Corporation
 Santa Ono, President of University of Michigan
 Sam Stanley, President of Michigan State University
 Mary Barra, Chair and CEO of General Motors

References 

Jake Bekemeyer, DBusiness: Business Leaders for Michigan Releases Plan to Spur Economic Growth in State, May 24, 2022

External links 
 https://businessleadersformichigan.com/competetowin/

Non-profit organizations based in Michigan
Organizations based in Detroit
Organizations established in 2009